Ambrogio Borgognone (variously known as Ambrogio da Fossano, Ambrogio di Stefano da Fossano, Ambrogio Stefani da Fossano or as il Bergognone or Ambrogio Egogni s1523/1524) was an Italian painter of the Renaissance period active in and near Milan.

Biography 
While he was nearly contemporary with Leonardo da Vinci, he painted in a style more akin to the pre-Renaissance, Lombard art of Vincenzo Foppa and Bernardino Zenale. The dates of his birth and death are unknown; he is said to have been born at Fossano in Piedmont and his appellation is attributed to his artistic affiliation with the Burgundian school.

His fame is principally associated with his work at the Certosa di Pavia complex, composed of the church and convent of the Carthusians. It is unlikely he designed, in 1473, the celebrated façade of the Certosa itself. He worked there for eight years starting in 1486, in collaboration with his brother Bernardino Bergognone, when he furnished the designs of the figures of the virgin, saints and apostles for the choir stalls, executed in tarsia or inlaid woodwork by Bartolomeo Pola, till 1494, when he returned to Milan. Only one known picture, an altarpiece at the Basilica of Sant' Eustorgio, can with good probability be assigned to a period of his career earlier than 1486.

For two years after his return to Milan, he worked at the church of San Satiro. From 1497 he was engaged for some time in decorating with paintings the church of the Incoronata in neighbouring Lodi. Documentation of him thenceforth is scant. In 1508 he painted for a church in Bergamo; in 1512, his signature appears in a public document of Milan; in 1524  and this is our last authentic record  he painted a series of frescoes illustrating the life of St. Sisinius in the portico of San Simpliciano at Milan. Borgognone is considered a modestly talented painter with marked individuality. He holds an interesting place in the most interesting period of Italian art.

The National Gallery, London, has a number or his works: the separate fragments of a silk banner painted for the Certosa, and containing the heads of two kneeling groups severally of men and women, and a large altarpiece of the marriage of St Catherine, painted for the chapel of Rebecchino near Pavia.

But to judge of his real powers and peculiar ideals, his system of faint and clear colouring, whether in fresco, tempera or oil; his somewhat slender and pallid types, not without something that reminds us of northern art in their Teutonic sentimentality as well as their fidelity of portraiture; the conflict of his instinctive love of placidity and calm with a somewhat forced and borrowed energy in figures where energy is demanded, his conservatism in the matter of storied and minutely diversified backgrounds to judge of these qualities of the master as they are, it is necessary to study first the great series of his frescoes and altarpieces at the Certosa, and next those remains of later frescoes and altarpieces at Milan and Lodi, in which we find the influence of Leonardo and of the new time mingling with, but not expelling, his first predilections.

Bernardino Luini is said to have been one of his pupils.

Gallery

References 

  Web gallery of Art

External links
Italian Paintings: North Italian School, a collection catalogue containing information about Bergognone and his works (see index; plates 33-45).

1470s births
1520s deaths
People from Fossano
15th-century Italian painters
Italian male painters
16th-century Italian painters
Painters from Milan
Renaissance painters
Fresco painters